Devils River State Natural Area is a  section of three ecosystems, the Edwards Plateau, the Tamaulipan mezquital and the Chihuahuan Desert. In 1857, future Confederate General John Bell Hood and a small U.S. Cavalry force skirmished with a group of Comanche braves along the banks of the Devil's River. In 1873, Texas Ranger Captain Pat Dolan had a skirmish with Native Americans, at the falls named for him. Dolan Falls in the natural area is the highest volume waterfall in Texas. The area was once home to the Comanche, Kiowa and Kickapoo tribes. Pictographs painted with red panthers are found in the area's fifty-three rock shelters, which archeologists have dated to 3000 b.c.. The "Buffalo dancer" pictograph depicts a Native American.

Named for the whitewater Devils River that runs through it, the area was once part of a large working ranch, but purchased by the Texas Parks and Wildlife Department in 1988. The area is home to many varieties of flora and fauna, including the Mexican free-tailed bat as well as live oak, pecan and sycamore trees. Devils River state natural area is a remote location surrounded by private ranches. Floating on the river is a three-day trip, with no modern conveniences available. While campsites are available, campers are advised to bring all basic necessities with them. Visitors are required to remove everything they bring into the area.

See also
List of Texas state historic sites

Notes

Citations

References

External links 

 Official Site

Texas state historic sites
Protected areas of Val Verde County, Texas
Protected areas established in 1988